Jakten på tidskristallen (The hunt for the time crystal) is the Sveriges Television's Christmas calendar for 2017. It is an adaptation of the book trilogy Speglarnas hemlighet by Erika Vallin.

For Rikard Wolff, the series became his final role, as he died on November 17 the same year.

Cast 

 Eva Rydberg – Professor Siv Styregaard
 Monna Orraryd – Asrin
 Vincent Wettergren – Max
 Naima Palmaer – Lima
 Rikard Wolff – Dr Ruben
 Klas Wiljergård – Lucas
 Felice Jankell – Fiona
 Fredde Granberg – Gert
 Kodjo Akolor – Limas Pappa
 Julia Ragnarsson – Amalia
 Sissela Benn – Limas mamma
 David Wiberg – Vaktchefen
 Bianca Kronlöf
 Patrik Elgh – Jungle monster

References

External links 
 

2017 Swedish television series debuts
2017 Swedish television series endings
Sveriges Television's Christmas calendar
Swedish time travel television series